Fudbalski Klub Plavi Put (English: Football Club Plavi Put) is a Bosnian football club based in Butmir, Sarajevo, Bosnia and Herzegovina. Club name means "blue path", named after street in Butmir. It was founded in 2008.

Players

Current squad

 

Plavi Put